Emerson is an unincorporated community in Jefferson County, in the U.S. state of Ohio. Emerson is usually considered to be the area that runs from the border of Mount Pleasant, Ohio to the junction between Route 250 and Route 150, and then when both Jefferson and Belmont 5 run into Pleasant Grove, Ohio on Route 250, and then finally when Township Road 128 splits into both the latter and Pinewood Drive, which then runs into Harrisville, Ohio.

History
Emerson was originally called Trenton, and under the latter name was laid out around 1815. A post office called Emerson was established in 1882, and remained in operation until 1932. Besides the post office, Emerson had its own schoolhouse.

References

Unincorporated communities in Jefferson County, Ohio
Unincorporated communities in Ohio